Hollis is a station on the Long Island Rail Road's Main Line at the intersection of 193rd Street and Woodhull Avenue in the Hollis neighborhood of Queens, New York City. With a few exceptions, only trains on the Hempstead Branch stop here.

History

The station was originally built as East Jamaica in May 1885 and renamed Hollis in September of the same year. It was rebuilt as part of a grade elimination project in 1915.  On June 22, 1958, five of 25 eastbound Hempstead Branch trains, and six of 26 westbound trains began skipping the station, reducing running times on those trains by one minute. Daily ridership at the station had decreased from 3,396 in 1930 to 230 in 1957. The station house was destroyed by arson on November 2, 1967 and a new one was built in the early 1990s.

Station layout
This station has two high-level wooden side platforms, each four cars long. The two middle tracks, not next to either platform, are used by through trains on the Port Jefferson, Ronkonkoma, Oyster Bay, and Montauk branches. A fifth track south of the south platform leads to the east end of the Hillside Facility and does not carry passenger service.

The station's only entrance is a pedestrian tunnel under the platforms and tracks that has a staircase to each platform and leads to 193rd Street and 99th Avenue on its south end and the dead-end of 193rd Street on its north end. Along the north platform is a pedestrian roadway that leads to 191st Street on its west end and Sagamore Avenue on its east end.

References

External links

1915 Hollis Station Photo (TrainsAreFun.com)
HOLLIS Interlocking (The LIRR Today)
99th Avenue and 193rd Street entrance from Google Maps Street View
Platforms from Google Maps Street View

Long Island Rail Road stations in New York City
Railway stations in Queens, New York
Railway stations in the United States opened in 1885